

Hereditary Princess of Modena

See also

List of Modenese consorts

 
House of Este
Duchesses of Modena